"Tatra Tiger" is a nickname that refers to the economy of Slovakia in period 2002 – 2007, following the ascendance of a right-leaning coalition in September 2002 which engaged in a program of liberal economic reforms. The name "Tatra Tiger" derives from the local Tatra mountain range.

In 2004 and 2005, Slovakia had one of the highest gross domestic product growth rates in the European Union after some of the Baltic countries, reaching 6%. In 2006, the year-over-year growth amounted to an unexpected 9.8% in the 3rd quarter, which helped to increase the overall annual economic growth expectation for 2006 from 6–6.5% to 8.2%. This 9.8% growth (a low estimate) can be partly ascribed to the launch of production at a new Peugeot SA plant. The growth came as a surprise to local analysts, given that another big foreign investor, Kia, launched its production in late 2006. In 4Q of 2007, the growth was 14.3%.

However, public polling shows that despite the resultant high growth rates, the public does not universally approve of the reforms, because they are associated with a drastic loss of government programs (reform of the previously government-run health system, complete reform of the pension system, etc.), the replacement of progressive taxation with a flat tax, rapid changes of laws and other legal regulations, and rising property prices. Moreover, unemployment jumped to very high levels immediately after the reforms began in 1998, although it decreased back to its 1998 level in 2006 and even below later on.

In the first quarter of 2009 the fall of GDP was −5.7% but in 2010 the GDP growth was 4.8% for the first quarter.

In the period 2005–2011 Slovakia's GDP increased by 38.3% which was the highest growth of all EU countries.

Statistics

Annual GDP growth rate

GDP per capita

In international dollars, at purchasing power parity (PPP) and Nominal GDP per capita. Numbers in brackets show the respective country's GDP per capita as a percentage of the European Union average (also measured at PPP).

See also

Four Asian Tigers: the original economic "tigers"—Hong Kong, Singapore, South Korea, and Taiwan—that experienced a period of high growth and industrialization between the 1960s and 1990s.
Celtic Tiger: Ireland's nickname during its period of rapid growth between the 1995 and 2007 before a property crash.
Baltic Tiger: a reference to the rapid economic growth of the Baltic states between the 2000s and 2006–2007.
Gulf Tiger: a nickname for the economic boom that Dubai has been experiencing since the 1990s.
Nordic Tiger: Iceland's nickname during its period of rapid growth between the 1990s and 2008 before a banking crash.

References

 "A new Direction for Slovak politics?" (preview), Foreign Report, Jane's Intelligence, December 12, 2005
 Post Report: Slovak Republic, U.S. Department of State, 12 May 2005
 "Slovakia's awakening: 'Tatra Tiger' is born", by Matthew Reynolds, New York Times, December 29, 2004
Once a Backwater, Slovakia Surges, by Matthew Reynolds, New York Times, December 28, 2004

Tiger economies
2000s economic history
Economy of Slovakia
2000s in Slovakia
Economic booms